Farhat Ehsas (born 1952) is a leading contemporary Urdu poet, journalist and translator. He has written extensively on socio-cultural and political issues. He is currently associated with the world's largest Urdu website Rekhta.

His real name is Farhatullah Khan and was born at Bahraich, Uttar Pradesh, India in 1952. He has worked as Assistant Editor of a research journal, published by the Zakir Husain Institute of Islamic Studies, Jamia Millia Islamia, New Delhi. He is coeditor of the book Sufism and Indian Mysticism. He recently published his book 'Qashqa Khaincha Dair Men Baitha'.

References

Urdu-language poets